Yuzhny is a rural locality (a settlement) in Paninsky Selsoviet of Oktyabrsky District, Amur Oblast, Russia. The population was 84 as of 2018. There are 6 streets.

Geography 
Yuzhny is located 13 km southwest of Yekaterinoslavka (the district's administrative centre) by road. Yekaterinoslavka is the nearest rural locality.

References 

Rural localities in Oktyabrsky District, Amur Oblast